Dulichiidae is a family of amphipods belonging to the order Amphipoda.

Genera:
 Dulichia Krøyer, 1845
 Dulichiopsis Laubitz, 1977
 Dyopedos Spence Bate, 1857
 Metadulichia Ariyama, 2019
 Paradulichia Boeck, 1871
 Paradyopedos Andres & Rauschert, 1990
 Pseudodulichia Rauschert, 1990

References

Corophiidea